New Hampshire Route 104 (abbreviated NH 104) is a  secondary east–west highway in central New Hampshire, United States. The highway runs from Danbury to Meredith on Lake Winnipesaukee in the Lakes Region.

The western terminus of NH 104 is in Danbury at U.S. Route 4. The eastern terminus is at U.S. Route 3 south of the town of Meredith, between Lake Winnipesaukee and Lake Waukewan. NH 104 is locally named the Ragged Mountain Highway between Danbury and Bristol.

Until the 1970s, NH 104 used the Smith River Road between Danbury and Bristol. This scenic, winding road parallels the Smith River. However it was a frustratingly slow drive as a main highway, so the new overland Ragged Mountain Highway was a welcome replacement route for NH 104, leaving the old Smith River Road as a popular route for recreational access to the river.

Major intersections

References

External links

 New Hampshire State Route 104 on Flickr

104
Transportation in Merrimack County, New Hampshire
Transportation in Grafton County, New Hampshire
Transportation in Belknap County, New Hampshire